Fórmula 3 Sudamericana was a South American Formula Three championship. It was inaugurated in 1987 and primarily held races in Brazil and Argentina, with a small number of events held in other countries across the continent. Its most notable graduates include former Formula One drivers Nelson Piquet Jr., Ricardo Zonta and Christian Fittipaldi, four-time Indianapolis 500 winner Hélio Castroneves, and Champ Car champion and former F1 driver Cristiano da Matta. The series was replaced for 2014 by the Brazilian Formula Three Championship, which focuses on Brazilian circuits and drivers.

Background
Prior to the creation in 1987 of a regional Formula Three championship in South America, the Codasur championship was held annually between 1983 and 1986. This series utilised local chassis or Formula Three chassis with Renault or Volkswagen 1500–1600cc engines. Each of the four drivers' championship titles went to Guillermo Maldonado of Argentina. Maldonado, like many of his contemporaries, also functioned as a team owner.

The Codasur Championship's team owners and the governing bodies of national motorsport in the region began collectively to discuss its replacement with a current European or worldwide formula. They wanted a formula that would provide young South American drivers with experience that would be relevant when, or if, they had the opportunity to further their career internationally. The long-established Formula Three was the obvious choice.

Petrobras was announced as the official sponsor of the 2010 season of Formula 3 South America. The agreement, made possible through the Law for Encouragement of Sport – Sports Ministry – was worth $3 million and valid for a period of 12 months.

The project also includes the acquisition of naming rights category, which from this year has been renamed Formula 3 Sudamericana Petrobras. The Brazilian oil company is also the official supplier of fuel and lubricant for all cars in Formula 3. Even under the contract are the development and implementation of events, promotions, and marketing.

Equipment
However, despite the ready availability of second-hand F3 chassis and engines, the organisers of the new championship commissioned their own chassis to F3 specification, which was built in Argentina by veteran TC 2000 Championship driver and engineer Oreste Berta's eponymous company. The Berta Mk3 was used exclusively during 1987, until the championship was opened up to other suppliers in the following year. From 1988 until the mid-1990s, chassis from Reynard, Ralt, TOM's and Dallara were in common use, but at that point, Dallara's increasing performance advantage had the same effect in South America as it had in Europe, and it became the de facto choice.

Since 2005, the series organisers have sought to keep budget requirements under stricter control by using a "control specification" engine, which is produced by Berta. It has considerably reduced running budgets since its introduction, not least because the teams are permitted to service the engines themselves. The Berta engine is used by all Class A entrants, but competitors in Class B, or Light, are still using other customer engines such as Mugen-Honda in a significantly older chassis. Class A entrants used the five-year-old Dallara F301 in 2006, while Light entrants used the F394 from 1994. F3 chassis are designed to a three-year lifecycle, with only minor annual updates.

Venues
During this early era, the championship very much lived up to its title, with events in Argentina, Brazil, Chile and Uruguay. Between 2002 and 2008, the series has limited itself to events in Brazil and Argentina. The Grand Prix of Piriápolis returned to the series in 2009. Local economic issues have tended to limit the potential for the maintenance and development of motor racing venues, which means that only the most popular circuits can afford to support the championship.

Scoring system
 The scoring system for 2010 replicates the new system introduced into Formula One:

Teams and drivers
Economics also plays a part in the demography of the competitors. Since its inception, F3 Sudamericana has been primarily the domain of Brazilian and Argentine drivers and teams, but that imbalance has worsened in this decade, with very few drivers from countries other than Brazil. Since 2001, there has been only one race that was not won by a Brazilian driver. Last year, just a small number of Argentine drivers competed in the series, and only in events on home soil.

In recognition of this shortcoming, the series' organisers and race promoters are working harder to make it an attractive and suitable proposition for drivers from the smaller South American nations. In addition to the cost reductions, steps have been taken to improve its public popularity, and hence, the marketing potential. This year, F3 Sudamericana will share its Brazilian venues with that country's Trofeo Maserati championship.

In spite of its economic limitations, and its relative geographical remoteness from the major centres of motorsport, F3 Sudamericana has nonetheless produced a number of recognised and notable drivers who have since established themselves in Europe and the United States. In addition to Castroneves and da Matta, the series' alumni include other Champ Car drivers past and present, such as Christian Fittipaldi (the nephew of Emerson) and Bruno Junqueira. Competing in the GP2 championship are 2003 runner-up Lucas di Grassi and 2004 champion Alexandre Sarnes Negrão.

Champions

See also

 Formula 3 Sudamericana drivers
 Brazilian Formula Three Championship

References

External links
 
 Formula Three Sudamericana at forix.com
 Speedsportmag.com - Results data from 1996 onwards
 F1prospects.com - Formula 3 news items

 
1987 establishments in South America
2013 disestablishments in South America
Recurring sporting events established in 1987
Recurring events disestablished in 2013
Defunct auto racing series
Formula Three series
Motorsport competitions in Brazil